The Seege of Troye, (some manuscripts – The Batayle of Troye), is a Middle English poem, the earliest in English of numerous medieval retellings of the Trojan War in art and literature. Somewhat crudely it thoroughly blends its two main sources, Dares Phrygius and Benoît de Sainte-Maure's Roman de Troie, and draws upon the Rawlinson Excidium Troie for episodes of the youth of Paris. The poem survives in four manuscripts, among the Harleian manuscripts (Harley 525), at Lincoln's Inn (Ms 150), Egerton Ms 2862 and Arundel (Arundel xxii)

The poem contains a lengthy and repetitive account of the Judgement of Paris, which is recounted by Paris to the assembled Trojans.

Notes

Seege of Troye, The
Seege of Troye, The
14th-century poems
Middle English literature
Works of unknown authorship